Stew peas is a Jamaican stew prepared using coconut milk, beans and salted meat. It is a common dish in Jamaica.

Overview
Stew peas is a Jamaican stew dish prepared using coconut milk, gungo peas (pigeon peas) or red peas (kidney beans), uncured meats and salted meats such as pork and beef as primary ingredients. Additional ingredients can include onion, garlic, escallions, pig tail, herbs and spices. In addition to being a main ingredient, the beans also serve to thicken the stew. Pinto beans are more commonly used in the dish in Spanish-speaking areas of the Caribbean. Canned beans can also be used to prepare stew peas, and the dish can be prepared using a pressure cooker. It is sometimes prepared without the use of meat.

In Jamaica, stew peas is often prepared using flour dumplings known as "spinners" in Jamaica. Stew peas is commonly served atop rice or with a side dish of rice. Rice is typically not included in the stew itself when it is cooked, and the stew serves to moisten and complement the separately-prepared rice. Stew peas contains a considerable amount of protein.

Stew peas is available in many areas of the Caribbean, is very popular in Jamaica, and has been described as a national dish of Jamaica. The dish is prepared in various unique ways by Jamaicans, and has been described as a staple dish in Jamaican homes and restaurants. In September 1992, the Jamaican newspaper The Gleaner declared stew peas with rice as "the best dish made in Jamaica" in its Home, Living and Food Guide.

History
Stew peas has been a dish in Jamaica since at least the 1940s, and recipes for it began to appear in cookbooks in the 1970s.

See also

 List of bean soups
 List of Jamaican dishes and foods
 List of dishes made using coconut milk
 Oil down – a Grenadian stew prepared using coconut milk and salted meat
 Rice and peas – a common dish in the Caribbean
 Run down – a Jamaican stew prepared using reduced coconut milk and meats

References

External links
 Jamaican Stew Peas and Rice Recipe. Cook Like a Jamaican.

Jamaican stews
Bean soups
Foods containing coconut
Meat dishes
Australian soups